Mountain's Edge is a planned community in the unincorporated town of Enterprise in Clark County, Nevada. It is a neighborhood within the southwest part of the Las Vegas Valley.

History
Focus Property Group started the construction of Mountain's Edge in February, 2004. The development plans included 14,500 homes and more than 22 neighborhoods with stores, office space, and shopping centers.

Schools
Carolyn S. Reedom Elementary School
William V. Wright Elementary School
Jan Jones Blackhurst Elementary School
Lois and Jerry Tarkanian Middle School (2006)
Lawrence and Heidi Cannarelli Middle School (2003)
Wilbur and Theresa Faiss Middle School (2007)
Desert Oasis High School (2008)

References

Enterprise, Nevada
Populated places established in 2004
Planned communities in Clark County, Nevada